The following is a list of some programmes broadcast by CNA.

Documentaries and current affairs programmes

CNA Correspondent 
Correspondents across the region bring highlights of news stories and features in their respective cities. Previously known as Correspondent's Diary, the show was presented by one of CNA's weeknight presenters until 2018. The show was re-titled in May 2020.

In Conversation 
This is the channel's one-on-one interview programme, presented by Lin Xueling.

Past guests who have been interviewed on the show include former Malaysian Prime Minister Mahathir Mohamad, Malaysia's opposition leader Anwar Ibrahim, Coca-Cola Company's President James Quincey, Twitter's Chief Executive Officer Jack Dorsey and notable Malaysian author Tash Aw. Previous seasons have also featured United States' 44th President Barack Obama, Myanmar's State Counsellor Aung San Suu Kyi, President of Egypt Abdel Fattah el-Sisi, Indonesia's President Joko Widodo and Uniqlo's founder Tadashi Yanai.

Get Rea! (Get Real) 
CNA's award-winning investigative documentary series. The programme is temporarily on hiatus.

Insight 
Insight investigates and analyses topical issues that impact Asia and the rest of the world, narrated and presented in some occasions by Genevieve Woo.

Japan Hour 
A 60-minute block featuring Japanese travel, food and culture, the programme is brought over from NHK World TV and TV Tokyo in Japan and is subtitled in English. Japan Hour, owing to copyright restrictions, is not available for live streaming outside Singapore.

Gangnam Insider's Picks 
A 30-minute programme featuring places, food and culture found within Seoul's Gangnam District; produced and originally broadcast by South Korea-based international broadcaster Arirang TV.

Money Mind 
Money Mind discusses the economy, markets, companies, financial products, and trends, presented by Dawn Tan and in some occasions by Yasmin Jonkers.

CNA Insider Documentaries 
Various documentaries that are relevant to current events affecting Asia. These documentaries are available on demand through CNA's website and CNA Insider's YouTube channel after broadcast.

Current affairs programmes from Channel 5 
In addition to its own produced programmes, CNA also re-broadcasts current affairs programmes from its domestic sister network Channel 5 for international viewers, including Talking Point and On the Red Dot.

News bulletins

Asia First 
A breakfast news and current affairs programme. Out of all other news bulletins, the show has the longest runtime of three hours, starting at 7:00am SGT. Asia First is a consolidation of two morning news predecessors: First Look Asia and Asia Business First. Previously, a half-hour weekly summary was aired on weekends, but that was later replaced by Asia Now's morning slots. The programme does not broadcast on major Asian public holidays, and during the two-week year-end period after Christmas (which lasts until the week after 1 January).

Asia First and its predecessor First Look Asia were simulcast on Channel 5 as de facto breakfast shows in Singapore. Simulcasts on 5 were cancelled after 30 April 2019 to accommodate children's programs previously aired on Okto which closed down the following day.

Current presenters: Julie Yoo, Steve Lai, Teresa Tang, Avril Hong (relief) Otteli Edwards (relief)

Business presenter: Avril Hong, Sarah Al-Khaldi (relief), Henry Yin (relief) Oliva Marzuki (relief)

Asia Now 
Monitoring developments in Asia, Asia Now brings the latest stories and breaking news to viewers. The rolling bulletin airs at various times of the day; running time and timeslots vary between weekdays and weekends/Singapore public holidays.

Current rotating presenters: Teresa Tang (Mondays & Fridays 11am/12pm timebelt), Chan Eu Imm (Tuesdays-Thursdays 11am/12pm timebelt), Angela Lim (Mondays-Wednesdays 2pm/3pm, Weekends 2pm/3pm/5pm timebelts), Otelli Edwards (Weekdays 5pm/6pm timebelt),  Glenda Chong (Weekdays 2pm/3pm or 5pm/6pm timebelts), Syahida Othman (Mondays-Sundays), Elakeyaa Selvaraji (Mondays-Sundays), Jill Neubronner (relief, mainly Weekends 6pm timebelt), Dawn Tan (relief), Loke Wei Sue (relief), Paul Sng (relief, Weekends), Steve Lai (relief if no Asia First), Avril Hong (relief if no Asia First), Julie Yoo (relief if no Asia First), Dylan Ang (relief, Weekends 6pm timebelt)

Rotating Business presenters: Olivia Marzuki, Sarah Al-Khaldi, Roland Lim, Henry Yin, Avril Hong (relief), Elizabeth Neo (relief) 
OR 
The main Asia Now Host when Business Presenter is Not Able Or when the Business Presenter is Presenting the Main show.

Asia Tonight 
CNA's flagship regional bulletin, reporting roundup of the top stories of the day across Asia, with occasional world news delivered on an Asian perspective. Formerly known as Primetime Asia, Asia Tonight airs nightly at 8:00pm SGT. In contrast to Singapore Tonight, the bulletin runs for a full hour on weeknights; half-hour edition air on weekends and if significant Asian countries (particularly business sectors) observe common public holidays within the work week, as well as during the year-end season which lasts from Christmas until the week following 1 January.

Current presenters: Loke Wei Sue (alternate relief on Weekends), Dawn Tan (alternate relief on Weekends), Jill Neubronner (Main Presenter on Weekends; alternate relief), Otelli Edwards (alternate relief), John Leong (relief), Paul Sng (relief, Weekends)

Asia Business presenter: Elizabeth Neo, Henry Yin (relief), Roland Lim (relief)

Headline News
A 2-minute update summarising the main stories across the region and around the world. Headlines are delivered in between CNA's news and current affairs programmes.

World Tonight 
Tracking the latest happenings outside Asia, World Tonight brings the day's latest global stories and breaking news to viewers. Broadcasting every day at midnight SGT, World Tonight is CNA's revival of a standalone bulletin for global news stories since the axing of Primetime World in 2018. It is also a replacement to News Now, the channel's former rolling and midnight bulletin title.

Current presenters: Paul Sng, Rani Samtani, Poh Kok Ing, Elizabeth Neo, Dawn Tan, Loke Wei Sue, Jill Neubronner (relief), Syahida Othman (relief), Keith Liu (Weekends)

Singapore Tonight 

CNA's local bulletin, delivering up-to-date news and analysis within Singapore. Airing nightly at 10:00pm SGT, the bulletin runs for a full hour on weeknights, and 30 minutes on weekends, key Singapore public holidays, and the year-end season from Christmas Day to the week following New Year's Day.

Current presenters: Loke Wei Sue (alternate relief on Weekends), Dawn Tan (alternate relief on Weekends), Jill Neubronner (Main Presenter on Weekends; alternate relief), Otelli Edwards (alternate relief), John Leong (Selected Wednesdays), Paul Sng (relief, Weekends)

Business presenter: Elizabeth Neo, Roland Lim (relief)

References 

Channel NewsAsia
Channel NewsAsia
Channel NewsAsia's programmes